The 2012 World TeamTennis season is the 37th season of the top professional tennis league in the United States. Before the start of the 2012 season, the St. Louis Aces announced they would not compete this year. The Newport Beach Breakers changed their name to the Orange County Breakers.

Competition format
The 2012 World TeamTennis season included 8 teams, split into two conferences (Eastern and Western). The Eastern Conference and Western Conference had 4 teams each. Each team played a 14 match regular season schedule, with 7 home and 7 away matches. World TeamTennis’s playoff format consisted of the top two teams in each conference playing a semifinal on either September 14 (Eastern Conference) or September 15 (Western Conference), and the winners of each match playing in the final on September 16, 2012.

Standings

Results table

Playoffs

References

External links
 Official WTT website

World Team season
World TeamTennis season
World TeamTennis seasons